Ahmad Paijan  is a former Singaporean football midfielder who played for Tiong Bahru and Terengganu.

Career
He had successful career with Singaporean sided, Tiong Bahru went he won 5 titles with them. After joined Malaysian sided, Terengganu, he helped the team won Malaysia Division 2 league in 1990. In the 1992 season, he carried the team to recorded their highest ever finish in the Division 1 league when they finished as runner-up to Pahang.

In late 1995, he became the second Malaysian naturalised player after Razali Alias when he received his Malaysian citizenship after 13 years of playing for Terengganu.

Honours

Club
Tiong Bahru
National Football League Division One: 1983, 1987
President's Cup: 1982, 1985, 1987

Terengganu
Malaysia Division 2: 1990

References

Living people
Singaporean footballers
Singapore international footballers
Association football midfielders
1964 births